Daniel Ellis (born June 19, 1980) is a Canadian former professional ice hockey goaltender who is currently a goaltending scout for the Chicago Blackhawks.

He played in the National Hockey League for the Dallas Stars, Nashville Predators, Tampa Bay Lightning, Anaheim Ducks, Carolina Hurricanes, and the Florida Panthers. He served as an assistant coach with the Omaha Lancers of the United States Hockey League in 2016-17 before assuming his current role.

Playing career

Amateur
Ellis was born in Saskatoon, Saskatchewan but grew up in Orangeville, Ontario and played his minor hockey for the AA Orangeville Flyers of the OMHA Tri-County Hockey League and then eventually AAA hockey for the Halton Hills Hurricanes of the OMHA South-Central Triple A Hockey League.

Ellis was drafted by the Owen Sound Platers of the Ontario Hockey League and played Major Midget hockey for Halton in 1996-97, and the following season for the Newmarket Hurricanes club of the Ontario Provincial Junior A Hockey League (OPJHL). Ellis maintained his amateur status in order to remain eligible for a US hockey scholarship.

After one season in Newmarket, Ellis moved south to the Omaha Lancers, in the USHL where he was awarded Goaltender of the Year, Player of the Year and named a First Team All-Star.

Following his USHL season, Ellis then spent three years at the University of Nebraska at Omaha before signing after the 2002-03 season.

Dallas Stars
The Dallas Stars drafted Ellis in the 2nd round, 60th overall, of the 2000 NHL Entry Draft. For the 2003–2004 season, Ellis split time between the Utah Grizzlies and Idaho Steelheads of the ECHL, finishing the season with the Steelheads. In Idaho, Ellis had great success, leading the team to a Kelly Cup Championship win and nabbing the 2004 Playoff MVP award with a record of 13–0 and a 1.86 goals-against average.

For the 2005–06 AHL season, Ellis spent his time exclusively with the Iowa Stars. He split playing time with fellow goalie Mike Smith, but ultimately lost the job as the season came to a close. He finished the season with a record of 16 wins, 13 losses and 1 tie.

Ellis made his NHL debut on February 8, 2004 against the Los Angeles Kings. Ellis made 25 saves en route to his first career win as Dallas defeated Los Angeles 4 - 3.

Nashville Predators
In 2007, Ellis signed as a free agent with the Nashville Predators. Due to sub-standard play from starting goalie Chris Mason, Ellis took over the starting goaltender duties for the Predators for the 2007–08 NHL season. On October 25, 2007, in only his second career start, his first with the Predators—who signed him as a free agent on July 5, 2007—he won 3–0 against the Atlanta Thrashers, making 20 saves en route to his first NHL shutout. On November 1, 2007, he posted another shutout against the Vancouver Canucks for his fourth win of the season. He played very well down the stretch, posting two shutouts in the final few games and leading the Predators to the playoffs. As a result, he was named as the NHL's Second Star of the Week for the week ending March 30, 2008.

Ellis posted impressive statistics during the 2007–2008 season, being among the top goaltenders in save percentage (1st), shutouts (T-3rd), and GAA (12th). He also received national coverage for his excessive weight loss during games, receiving intravenous fluids after games, and for his shutout streak of 233:39 over the course of four games.

He earned the nickname "Snowstorm" in the spring of 2008 when the poor play of Ellis and teammate Chris Mason caused the team to call up minor-league goalie Pekka Rinne. However, Rinne was delayed from joining the team due to a snowstorm, and Ellis was given the start in the subsequent game against the Chicago Blackhawks on March 22, 2008. He held the Blackhawks to one goal on 38 shots and led the Predators to a 2–1 shootout victory. This victory earned him the starting job for the team, lasting into the 2008 playoffs.

He was the starting goalie for Nashville in their 2008 first-round series against the number one-seeded Detroit Red Wings. Ellis stopped 71 of 78 shots he faced in the first two games, both losses. Back home at Nashville for games three and four, he proceeded to stop 62 of 67 shots as the Predators won both games at home to tie the series at 2. Game 5 was Ellis' best game of the series as he made 52 saves in a 2–1 overtime loss. The Red Wings closed out the series in Game 6 at Nashville with a 3–0 win. Ellis was victimized by Red Wings defenceman Nicklas Lidström's skipping shot from behind center ice for the game's first goal, which turned out to be the winner.

On June 19, 2008, Ellis was re-signed to a two-year, $3.5 million contract by the Predators. During the 2008–09 season, Ellis wasn't as sharp as the previous season, recording only 11 wins compared to his 23 wins of the previous season. Because of this, Rinne, who was Nashville's backup goaltender at the start of the season, took over the starting job. Ellis recorded 15 wins in 31 appearances during the 2009–10 NHL season with a 2.69 goals-against-average.

On June 29, 2010, Ellis' negotiation rights were traded to the Montreal Canadiens with Dustin Boyd, for Sergei Kostitsyn and future considerations. Without a deal in place before July 1, 2010, Ellis became an unrestricted free agent.

Tampa Bay Lightning

Ellis signed a two-year, $3 million deal with the Tampa Bay Lightning as a free agent on July 1, 2010.

Later years
On February 24, 2011 Ellis was traded to the Anaheim Ducks in a goalie swap for Curtis McElhinney. After posting a solid 8-3 record upon his arrival in Anaheim, he made a postseason start in round one of the 2011 Playoffs, but lost the starting job to Ray Emery after allowing four goals on 24 shots.

After the conclusion of the 2012–13 NHL lockout and playing on an AHL contract with the Charlotte Checkers of the AHL, Ellis signed with NHL affiliate, the Carolina Hurricanes on January 8, 2013 as a backup to starter Cam Ward.  Ellis got into his first game with the Hurricanes during the first game of the season, January 19 against the Florida Panthers after Ward let in four goals in the first period.

On July 5, 2013 after a one-year stint in Carolina, Ellis re-joined his original draft team the Dallas Stars, on a two-year deal to be the back-up goalie to Kari Lehtonen, with an Average Annual Value of $900,000.

On March 5, 2014, Ellis was traded to the Florida Panthers in return for goalie Tim Thomas.  He appeared in six games for the Panthers that season.  In September 2014, the Panthers assigned him to their AHL affiliate, the San Antonio Rampage.

On July 4, 2015, having left the Panthers as a free agent, Ellis signed a one-year, two-way contract with the Washington Capitals  and spent most of the season playing with the Hershey Bears, their AHL affiliate.

Twitter controversy
On September 8, 2010, Ellis lashed out to the public via his Twitter account, expressing frustration and anger towards the 24 percent pay cut NHL players took when the 2004-05 NHL Lockout was settled with the new collective bargaining agreement by stating, "I am more stressed about money now than I was in college." He then stated that "players deserve the money they get because they are specialists."

Despite signing a two-year, $3 million contract with the Lightning, Ellis added, "If you lost 18% of your income would you be happy? If you don’t make a lot of money, I don’t expect you to understand." When a negative reception ensued, he told followers, "I am not holding a gun at your head to follow so do yourself a favor." He then retracted his statement released by the Lightning, stating "I am deeply sorry if I offended anyone via my recent statements on Twitter. I should have known better." Mike Russo of the Minneapolis Star Tribune commented, "No matter the point, pro athletes are better off not talking money during such turbulent times."

Personal life
Ellis was born in Saskatoon, Saskatchewan, but was raised in Orangeville, Ontario. He moved to Nebraska when his college career began and resides during the offseason in Omaha. Ellis is a devout Christian and displays a cross at the back of his mask. He is married and has two children.

Records
Nashville Predators franchise record for longest shutout streak (233:39)
Nashville Predators franchise record for saves and shots faced in a single game (52)
University of Nebraska-Omaha (CCHA) franchise record records for games played (118)
University of Nebraska-Omaha (CCHA) franchise record records for games started (117)
University of Nebraska-Omaha (CCHA) franchise record records for wins (53)
University of Nebraska-Omaha (CCHA) franchise record records for shutouts (7)
University of Nebraska-Omaha (CCHA) franchise record records for saves (3,125)

Career statistics

Regular season and playoffs

Awards and honors

References

External links

1980 births
Anaheim Ducks players
Canadian ice hockey goaltenders
Carolina Hurricanes players
Charlotte Checkers (2010–) players
Chicago Blackhawks scouts
Dallas Stars draft picks
Dallas Stars players
Florida Panthers players
Hamilton Bulldogs (AHL) players
Hershey Bears players
Ice hockey people from Ontario
Ice hockey people from Saskatchewan
Idaho Steelheads (ECHL) players
Iowa Stars players
Living people
Nashville Predators players
Omaha Lancers players
Omaha Mavericks men's ice hockey players
People from Orangeville, Ontario
San Antonio Rampage players
Sportspeople from Saskatoon
Tampa Bay Lightning players
Utah Grizzlies (AHL) players
University of Nebraska Omaha alumni